The 2005 Torneo Descentralizado (known as the Copa Cable Mágico for sponsorship reasons) was the eighty-ninth season of Peruvian football. A total of 12 teams competed in the tournament. Sporting Cristal won its fifteenth Primera División title after beating Cienciano in the season final. The season started on March 5, 2005, ended on December 21, 2005.

Changes from 2004

Structural changes
Starting with the 2004 season, the two relegated teams will be able to choose to play in the Segunda División or drop to their regional league as the Segunda División will now be played with non-capital teams. The number of first division teams dropped from 14 to 13.

Promotion and relegation
Deportivo Wanka and Grau–Estudiantes finished the 2004 season in 13th and 14th place, respectively, on the three-season average table and thus were relegated to their regional league. They were replaced by the champion of the 2004 Copa Perú Sport Áncash.

Teams

Torneo Apertura

Torneo Clausura

Final

Aggregate table

Relegation table

Updated as of games played on December, 2005.

Top scorers
18 goals
 Miguel Mostto (Cienciano)
17 goals
 Sergio Ibarra (Cienciano)
 Roberto Demus (Coronel Bolognesi)
16 goals
 Paul Cominges (Atlético Universidad)
15 goals
 Hernán Rengifo (U. San Martín)

External links
Peru 2005 season Details on RSSSF

Peruvian Primera División seasons
Peru
Torneo Descentralizado, 2005